Jeshi la Kujenga Uchumi Sports Club, or simply JKU SC is a football club from Zanzibar.

The team won the Nyerere Cup in 1974.

Achievements
Zanzibar Premier League: 2
Champions: 2017, 2018.

Nyerere Cup: 1
Winners: 1974.

Performance in CAF competitions
CAF Champions League: 2 appearances
2018–19 – Preliminary Round
2018 – Preliminary Round

CAF Confederation Cup: 2 appearances
2016 – First Round
2006 – Preliminary Round

African Cup Winners' Cup: 1 appearance
1975 – First Round

References

External links

Football clubs in Tanzania
Zanzibari football clubs